Robert R. Brown may refer to:

 R. R. Brown (1879–1950), American football player, coach and college athletics administrator
 Robert R. Brown (bishop) (1910–1994), author and Episcopal bishop of Arkansas